Eastern Orthodoxy in Jordan refers to adherents, communities and institutions of Eastern Orthodox Christianity in Jordan. Within ecclesiastical order of the Eastern Orthodox Church, communities of Eastern Orthodox Christians in Jordan belong mainly to jurisdiction of the Eastern Orthodox Patriarchate of Jerusalem, and partially to the Eastern Orthodox Patriarchate of Antioch. The Jordanian Eastern Orthodox Christians are believed to number 120,000, most of whom are Arabic speaking or by some accounts more than 300,000. There are currently 29 Eastern Orthodox churches – with that number on the increase – which come under the Jerusalem Patriarchate. Most of the Greek Orthodox Christians live in Amman and surrounding areas. The Jerusalem Patriarchate has become known in the past for its pan-Arab orientation, possibly because it exists in various parts of the Arab world. Converts from Islam to Christianity risk the loss of civil rights. Christmas and the Gregorian calendar New Year are recognized holidays in Jordan.

The two predominantly Orthodox towns are Fuheis and Al Husn.

See also

References

Sources